Hyperaspis syriaca is a species of lady beetle. It occurs in Turkey, Iran and possibly neighboring areas, as well as on some islands of the Aegean.

See also
List of Hyperaspis species

References

Coccinellidae
Beetles described in 1885